The 2024 Las Vegas mayoral election will take place on April 2, 2024, to elect the mayor of Las Vegas, Nevada. Incumbent independent mayor Carolyn Goodman is term-limited and cannot seek re-election to a fourth term in office.

Candidates

Declared
Shelley Berkley, former U.S. Representative for Nevada's 1st congressional district (1999–2013) and nominee for U.S. Senate in 2012 (Party affiliation: Democratic)
Cedric Crear, city councilor for the 5th ward (Party affiliation: Democratic)
Kara Jenkins, administrator of the Nevada Equal Rights Commission
Victoria Seaman, city councilor for the 2nd ward and former state assemblywoman (Party affiliation: Republican)

References

Las Vegas
Las Vegas
Mayoral elections in Las Vegas